The following is a summary of Kerry county football team's 2022 season. It was a first season back in charge for newly reappointed Kerry manager Jack O'Connor.

Competitions

National Football League Division 1

Table

Reports

Munster Senior Football Championship

Fixtures

Bracket

All-Ireland Senior Football Championship

Management team

Appointed 4 October 2021:
Bainisteóir: Jack O'Connor (Piarsaigh Na Dromada)
Roghnóirí: Micheál Quirke (Kerins O'Rahilly's), Diarmuid Murphy (Dingle)
Later additions:
Head coach: Paddy Tally, as of 8 October 2021
Performance coach: Tony Griffin
Head of athletic development: Jason McGahan
Strength and conditioning coach: Arthur Fitzgerald
Sports science: John Barry
Statistics: Colin Trainor
Video: John C. O'Shea
Team doctors: Dr Mike Finnerty and John Rice
Physiotherapists: Jimmy Galvin and Paudie McQuinn
Masseurs: Harry O'Neill and Liam O'Regan
Goalkeeping coach: Brendan Kealy
Nutritionists: Kevin Beasley and Gavin Rackard (Rackard is also performance nutritionist for Connacht Rugby)
Equipment: Colm Whelan
Equipment/in-house referee: Brendan Griffin

References

Kerry
Kerry county football team seasons